Yves Nyami (born 8 August 1995) is a DR Congolese international footballer  player who plays as a midfielder for  Ifk Malmö.

Early life
Nyami was born in Villeurbanne, France to DR Congolese parents. He started his career in France, playing then for French lower clubs: Grenoble U19, FC Bourg-P. U19 and Bourg-Péronnas, Football Bourg-en-Bresse Péronnas 01 and Edusport Academy.

Professional career
On 13 January 2016, Yves joined USL Championship club New York Red Bulls II on a two-year deal.
He moved to Gibraltar National League club Glacis United in July 2016.
After spells at  New York Red Bulls II and Glacis United , Nyami  moved to Spain in 2017 to sign for Rápido de Bouzas.
In the summer of 2018 he committed his future to the ambitious project of Swedish club Åtvidabergs FF.
He joined Italian club ASD Virtus Cilento in November 2021.

International career
Nyami has represented  DR Congo U-21.

References

External links 
    
 Yves Nyami at playmakerstats.com

1995 births
Living people
Democratic Republic of the Congo footballers
New York Red Bulls II players
Expatriate footballers in Gibraltar
Gibraltar National League players
USL Championship players